Dinara Safina and Elena Vesnina were the defending champions, but Safina chose not to participate, and only Vesnina competed that year.
Vesnina partnered with Maria Sharapova, but lost in the first round to Ekaterina Makarova and Tatiana Poutchek.

Seeds

Draw

Finals

Top half

Bottom half

2009 WTA Tour
2009 BNP Paribas Open